The 2013 World Aesthetic Gymnastics Championships, the 14th edition of the Aesthetic group gymnastics competition, was held in Lahti, Finland from June 7 to 9, at the Isku Areena.

Participating nations

Medal winners

Results

Senior
The top 12 teams (2 per country) and the host country in Preliminaries qualify to the Finals.

References

External links
http://www.ifagg.com/wp-content/uploads/2013/04/Bulletin-3.pdf

2013
2013 in Finnish sport
International gymnastics competitions hosted by Finland 
2013 in gymnastics
International sports competitions in Helsinki